MapAction is a non-governmental organisation that specialises in providing mapping for humanitarian emergencies.  MapAction is a registered UK charity. 

The charity was founded as Aid for Aid in 1999 but became operational in 2003 and changed its name to MapAction. Its first emergency mission was to Lesotho in 2003 and Sri Lanka in response to the Asian tsunami in December 2004. Since then it has sent teams to many emergencies all over the world including floods, earthquakes and hurricanes, and humanitarian situations such as Iraq, Afghanistan and Nigeria . MapAction works with a range of partners including United Nations agencies, International non-government organisations and the Red Cross and Red Crescent Movement. It also works with regional inter-state organisations such as the Caribbean Disaster Emergency Management Agency, the ASEAN Humanitarian Assistance Centre and the Centre for Emergency Situations and Disaster risk reduction. At the national level MapAction uses its experience of humanitarian mapping and information management to help disaster management agencies around the world put in place the data, technology and skills needed to be well-prepared for any type of large-scale emergency. 

MapAction has a small full-time staff, with most of its work delivered by skilled and trained volunteers. Its volunteers are skilled in geographical information systems, data management and software development and are trained  to work in emergencies. As well as responding to emergencies, the volunteers also provide training to others. 
MapAction receives funding from several institutions, including the UK Government's Department for International Development (DFID), the Netherlands Ministry of Foreign Affairs and USAID Office of Foreign Disaster Assistance (OFDA) and the German Federal Foreign Office (GFFO).

References

External links 
 

Charities based in the United Kingdom
Emergency management
Humanitarian aid organizations
Maps
Organisations based in Oxfordshire
South Oxfordshire District